Rakthasaakshikal Sindabad (English: Long live the martyrs) is a 1998 Indian Malayalam-language historical political thriller movie directed by Venu Nagavalli, featuring Mohanlal, Suresh Gopi and Sukanya in the lead roles. The revolt scenes in the film were directed by Priyadarshan.

The film released on 30 October 1998 coinciding with the thirtieth anniversary of Punnapra-Valayar.

Plot 
A political story set in the pre-independent India when Communism came into the picture.

Cast 
 Mohanlal as Siva Subrahmanya Iyer
 Suresh Gopi as Urmees Tharakan Mappilassery
 Nassar as Divan Sir C. P. Ramaswami Iyer
 Murali as E. Sreedharan
 Nedumudi Venu as Iyer's elder brother
 Zainuddin as comrade
 Karamana Janardanan Nair as Raman Thirumulpadu
 Rajan P. Dev as Mappilassery Tharakan
 Mala Aravindan
 Zainuddin
 Jagannatha Varma
 Sukanya as Sivakami Ammal
 Ranjitha
 Maathu
 Sukumari as Subbulaxmi Ammal, Iyer's mother
 Kalamandalam Sreejaya as Ammini

Production 
The film is based on the Punnapra-Vayalar agitation and was criticised for not doing justice to the history.

Soundtrack 
The film's soundtrack contains 9 songs, all composed by M. G. Radhakrishnan. Lyrics were by P. Bhaskaran, O. N. V. Kurup, Gireesh Puthenchery and Ezhacheri Ramachandran.

References

External links 
 

1998 films
1990s Malayalam-language films
Films about communism
1990s political thriller films
Indian political thriller films
Films directed by Venu Nagavally
Films set in the 20th century
Films scored by M. G. Radhakrishnan
Films set in Kerala
History of India on film
History of Kerala on film
Films shot in Alappuzha